Joe Miñoso (born September 25, 1978) is an American theater and television actor. He currently stars in NBC's Chicago Fire.

Early life
He saw his first girlfriend in a school play at Lincoln High School where she took him backstage and he decided that he wanted to be involved in acting. Minoso joined the stage crew, eventually auditioning for a role in their production of Dracula the following year. He graduated from Adelphi University with a bachelor's degree in fine arts, and Northern Illinois University with a Master's in fine arts.

Career
Joe Minoso worked extensively in the theater prior to his television and film appearances. He worked at Chicago's Teatro Vista, the largest Latino theater company in the Midwest.

Personal life
Prior to Chicago Fire, Joe Minoso lived on the North Side of Chicago. During filming for Chicago Fire, Minoso lived with co-stars Charlie Barnett and Yuri Sardarov.
On October 16, 2016, Minoso married Chicago Fire make up artist Caitlin Murphy Miles.

Filmography

Television

Films

Shorts

References

External links

Official Twitter

Living people
People from the Bronx
Adelphi University alumni
Northern Illinois University alumni
21st-century American male actors
American male television actors
Male actors from New York (state)
1978 births